10/11 may refer to:
October 11 (month-day date notation)
November 10 (day-month date notation)
10 shillings and 11 pence in UK predecimal currency
KOLN and KGIN television in Lincoln, Nebraska